Beforeigners is a Norwegian television series that premiered on 21 August 2019. The show was created and written by Eilif Skodvin and Anne Bjørnstad, and directed by Jens Lien. Produced by Rubicon TV AS for HBO Nordic, it is the first Norwegian-language series produced by the Nordic region channel of American network HBO.

The series concerns the titular "beforeigners", people from different time periods who suddenly appear in the present, and their integration into 21st-century Norway. The protagonists are Lars (Nicolai Cleve Broch), an Oslo police detective, and Alfhildr (Krista Kosonen), a Viking-era recruit, who investigate the murder of a Stone Ager. In September 2020, HBO confirmed that the series had been renewed for a second season. Season two premiered on  HBO Max in Europe on 5 December 2021, and in the United States on 23 December 2021. In the second season, Alfhildr and Lars investigate Oslo murders with ties to Jack the Ripper.

Premise

Season 1

Beforeigners is set in Oslo, where people from the Stone Age, Viking Age, and the 19th century appear in Bjørvika bay. These migrants, or "Beforeigners", attempt to integrate into contemporary Norway. Senior detective Lars and Viking-era recruit Alfhildr investigate a Stone Age woman's murder. Alfhildr and fellow shield-maiden Urðr help their Viking commander, Thorir Hund. Lars' daughter, Ingrid, and her friend Maddie, fake a "time migration" for Russefeiring. Maddie returns older and with visions of the past. Maddie welcomes the arrival of Olaf the Stout.

Season 2

Lars and Alfhildr investigate brutal murders with ties to Jack the Ripper. Two fake UK police consultants confirm the link to Ripper murders, though these are later denied by real London police. Ingrid is pregnant with Sturla's baby. A search is on for three women who "time-migrated" from Victorian-era London to Oslo. Magnus the Good's DNA confirms the identity of Olaf the Stout. A Viking-era völva reveals Alfhildr's importance to Olaf's reinstatement as King of Norway. Lars and Alfhildr pursue John Roberts, a theoretical physicist.

Cast and characters

Sources:

 Nicolai Cleve Broch as Lars Haaland: Oslo police senior detective 
 Krista Kosonen as Alfhildr Enginnsdóttir (patronymic literally: no one's daughter): former Viking shield-maiden, multi-temporal police recruit
 Tobias Santelmann as "Blond Viking" (Olaf the Stout)/Olav Haraldsson: Viking king of Norway, later canonized as St. Olav
 Ragnhild Gudbrandsen as Wenche: police detective, Lars' subordinate
  as Harald Eriksen: police section leader, Lars' superior
 Stig Henrik Hoff as Tommy Henriksen/Thorir Hund: former Viking commander, delivery rider
  as Gregers Nicolai Schweigaard: Marie's 19th-century husband
 Ylva Bjørkås Thedin as Ingrid Haaland: Lars and Marie's daughter
  as Chief of Police, Grete Skog: Harald's boss
 Mikkel Bratt Silset as Nabo (literally: neighbour) Kurukhés: Lars' neighbour
 Madeleine Malling Breen as Madeleine "Maddie" Aas: Ingrid's school friend
  as Alex Pedersen: police detective, Lars' subordinate, undercover Norwegian intelligence agent
 Lavrans Haga as Jørn: police detective, Lars' subordinate
 Agnes Kittelsen as Marie Gran: Lars' ex-wife, married to Gregers
  as Othilia Winther: 19th-century journalist
 Pål Sverre Hagen as Doctorand: former scientist, neo-Luddite cult leader
  as Oddvar: forensic pathologist
 Celin Ayara as Sofie: Maddie's school friend
 Tiril Gjesdal Clausen as Aisha: Maddie's school friend
 Aslak Maurstad as Preacher: 19th-century doomsayer

Season 1 cast
 Ágústa Eva Erlendsdóttir as Urðr Sighvatsdóttir: former Viking shield-maiden
  as Navn Ukjent (literally: Name Unknown): Stone Age man
  as HC (Holger Caspersen): 19th-century brothel owner
 Eili Harboe as Ada/Trine Syversen: former military drone specialist, neo-Luddite
 Jeppe Beck Laursen as Skjalg Egilsson: Viking skald
 Bhkie Male as Gedi Suleyman: security company director
 Odd-Magnus Williamson as Jeppe: harbour police
 Nils Jørgen Kaalstad as Kirketjener/Church Servant: Olaf adherent
 Jóhannes Haukur Jóhannesson as Kalv Torbjørnsson: Viking, Åsatru missionary
  as Jeanette: Tommy/Thorir's modern-era wife

Season 2 cast
Sources:<ref name="Season 2 cast">Season 2 cast:
 
 {{cite web | url = https://www.dagsavisen.no/kultur/2021/12/01/tobias-santelmann-om-beforeigners-noe-av-det-feteste-jeg-har-vaert-med-pa/ | title = Tobias Santelmann om Beforeigners: – Noe av det feteste jeg har vært med på | trans-title = Tobias Santelmann on Beforeigners':' – One of the fattest things I've been involved in | last = Engelsen | first = Thale | work = Dagsavisen | date = 1 December 2021 | language = no | access-date = 2 January 2022 | archive-url = https://web.archive.org/web/20211206011552/https://www.dagsavisen.no/kultur/2021/12/01/tobias-santelmann-om-beforeigners-noe-av-det-feteste-jeg-har-vaert-med-pa/ | archive-date = 6 December 2021 }}
 
 
 
</ref>
 Hedda Stiernstedt as the völva: former Viking-era slave, later a witch and Old Norse spiritual leader
 Paul Kaye as John Roberts: theoretical quantum physicist, researched time-migration and 19th-century serial killer Jack the Ripper
 Billy Postlethwaite as Isaac Ben Joseph: Victorian-era Ripper hunter, follows Jack to modern Oslo, poses as English consultant, "Mr. Rubenstein"
 Jade Anouka as Adepero Abeke: Nigerian-born 19th-century time migrant, London-based neo-Luddite, poses as English police officer, "Precious Clark"
 Philip Rosch as Henry Black: Counter Terrorism Command (SO15) senior investigator
 Herman Flesvig as Sturla Arnesson: Viking-era TV weatherman, Olaf's friend
 Ann Akinjirin as Precious Clark: Scotland Yard homicide officer
  as Odin: Lars' hallucination, appears as a small woman
 Marius Lien as Aslakr: Olaf's subordinate
 Per Kjerstad as Gegnir: Olaf's subordinate
 Hanne Skille Reitan as Sunniva: police psychiatrist
  as Sarah Murphy: 19th-century time-migrant, subway tunnel victim
 Eva Verpe as Emma Wilson: 19th-century time-migrant, Ekebergparken Sculpture Park victim
 Kristine Hartgen as Nessie Olssen/Olsen: 19th-century time-migrant, hotel victim

Background and production
After creating the show Lilyhammer, Anne Bjørnstad and Eilif Skodvin decided to explore science fiction ideas. Skodvin suggested the core concept of "refugees arriving not from a different location but from different times". The story of Beforeigners was built around that concept, with two main characters, Lars and Alfhildr, chosen early on. The creators were inspired by shows such as True Love and District 9, and the story itself was influenced by The Leftovers and the sci-fi classics Brave New World and Nineteen Eighty-Four.

In July 2017, Rubicon TV received  from the Norwegian film and television incentive scheme to develop Beforeigners, and awarded  in April 2018 to produce the series.

Bjørnstad and Skodvin hired linguists for the actors. Julian Kirkeby Lysvik provided the Stone Agers' language, Alexander Kristoffersen Lykke translated Old Norwegian for Viking speech, and André Nilsson Dannevig tackled the 19th-century version of Norwegian. Finnish actress Krista Kosonen had to learn Norwegian and Old Norse for her role. Filming of season 1 took place in Oslo and Lithuania.

In February 2020, Rubicon TV was granted  in incentive scheme funding to produce a second season. Filming began in October 2020 but was delayed due to COVID-19 restrictions and shutdowns in Oslo. Bjørnstad and Skodvin returned as scriptwriters and Lien as director, with HBO Nordic replaced by HBO Max.

In January 2022, the Norwegian Film Institute announced that Rubicon TV had applied for funding from the Norwegian incentive scheme to produce a third season of the series.

Removal of series by HBO Max
In the first week of July 2022, HBO Max abruptly removed Beforeigners from its series lineup, along with all Nordic-region content, after the merger of WarnerMedia with Discovery. WarnerMedia owns HBO.

ReleaseBeforeigners premiered in Europe on HBO Nordic and HBO Europe, and in the United States on HBO, on 21 August 2019.

The second season premiered in Europe on HBO Max on 5 December 2021, followed by the United States on 23 December 2021.

Reception
Nina Metz of the Chicago Tribune gave the series three (out of four) stars and said it was "A sci-fi buddy cop series, the show pairs a grizzled detective [Broch] with an eager-to-impress Viking warrior [Kosonen]... Though structured as a crime drama, the show has a wonderfully dry sense of humor, and there's something intriguing in the idea of people from different eras jostled together, some adapting better than others. The metaphors relating to racism and xenophobia and a host of other bigotries are obvious." Pajibas Dustin Rowles wrote, "It's a solid crime drama with a neat, high-concept premise, and some fantastic performances (again, especially that of Kosonen). If you have a few hours and love murder shows, time travel, commentary on immigration, and even a touch of Scandinavian history, Beforeigners is an addictive binge."

Tor Aavatsmark of Lyd & Billede found the show "focusing on the uniqueness and originality of the fact that a whole bunch of people from the Stone Age, Viking Age and 19th century suddenly find their way into today's Scandinavian welfare state – with all the challenges, cultural conflicts and overtly comic situations that this entails." But Aavatsmark felt that season 2 is "far less funny...and the comedy that remains rarely causes the laughter muscles to move. The fact that Olav the Holy in the present ends up as a narcissistic cocaine junkie seems more sought after than funny...production seems so cheap...[its] special effects are under criticism. Just look at the weird artificial filter laid over Oslo's skyline to make it look worn and dirty, or the bullet whizzing through the air in slow motion. It's on the edge of the amateurish." Mia Carlsen of Serienytt, on the other hand, found that "[it] gives the impression that the series holds on to its charming narrative style and is true to its characters. Everything and everyone seems to be the same as when the series left us...but with darker undertones than last time. Either way, it's good to be back in dystopian Oslo. At least we're ready for some answers." Carlsen praised the series creators, Bjørnstad and Skodvin, who have "put a lot of effort into creating a full-fledged experience of what is happening in Oslo and elsewhere in the world. I don't think we're ever going to fully understand or appreciate how amazing this is done, from language to costumes to food to norms to behavior and religions."

Awards and nominationsBeforeigners was nominated for Best Drama Series at the Gullruten 2020 awards, thus becoming the first HBO production to be nominated for this prize. At the Norwegian Series Critics Awards in September 2020, the series was nominated for Best Norwegian Drama, while Krista Kosonen received a nomination for Best Actress in a Norwegian Series.

Episodes

Season 1 (2019)

Season 2 (2021)

References

External links

 Beforeigners at Rubicon TV
 
 The Languages of Beforeigners (website of Beforeigners'' linguists)

2019 Norwegian television series debuts
2010s Norwegian television series
2010s science fiction television series
Norwegian crime television series
Television shows set in Norway
HBO Europe original programming
HBO Max original programming